The Rockies can mean the following:
 Rocky Mountains, a North American mountain range
 Canadian Rockies, a North American mountain range in Canada
 Colorado Rockies, a Colorado Major League baseball team
 Colorado Rockies (NHL), a former NHL hockey team that became the New Jersey Devils
 The Rockies, Cork, Ireland, the nickname of Blackrock National Hurling Club, an historic sports team in Cork, Ireland
 Rockies Express Pipeline, a natural gas pipeline from Rocky Mountains to Ohio
 Little Rockies is a reference to the Little Rocky Mountains in Montana
North American Cordillera, the entire set of mountain ranges on the west coast of North America.

See also
 Rocky Mountain (disambiguation)
 Rock (disambiguation)
 Rocky (disambiguation)
 Rockey (disambiguation)